The Spar Flanders Diamond Tour is a women's professional one-day road bicycle race held in Belgium. It is currently rated by the Union Cycliste Internationale (UCI) as a 1.1 race, after originally debuting as a 1.2 race.

Past winners

References

External links

Cycle races in Belgium
Women's road bicycle races